Escape From Paradise City is a 2007 computer game created by Danish studio Sirius Games, the sequel to 2004's Gangland. Published by Cdv Software Entertainment, it was released on October 26, 2007.

Reception

The game received "mixed" reviews according to the review aggregation website Metacritic.

References

External links
cdv Entertainment 

Dystopian video games
2007 video games
Focus Entertainment games
Windows games
Windows-only games
Organized crime video games
Real-time strategy video games
Video games developed in Denmark
CDV Software Entertainment games
Multiplayer and single-player video games